Richard Alsop Wise (September 2, 1843 – December 21, 1900) was an educator and politician from Virginia. He was a U.S. Representative for parts of two terms. He was a son of  Henry Alexander Wise, grandson of John Sergeant, brother of John Sergeant Wise, and cousin of George Douglas Wise, all U.S. Representatives.

Biography

Early life
He was born in Philadelphia, Pennsylvania, the son of future Governor of Virginia Henry A. Wise and Sarah Sergeant, daughter of U.S. Representative John Sergeant. He attended private schools in Richmond, Virginia, Harrison's Academy in Albemarle County, Virginia, and then the College of William and Mary for two years, until the American Civil War began.

Civil War
During the war, he served in the Confederate States Army, first as a private in Stuart's cavalry, and then as an aide to his father, who was a  brigadier general. Officially he was Assistant Inspector General of Wise's Brigade, in the Army of Northern Virginia.

Medical career
He graduated in medicine from the Medical College of Virginia in 1867 and practiced  that profession for a few years.

In 1869, he returned to William and Mary as Professor of Chemistry, and taught there until 1881. From 1882 to 1885 he was Superintendent of the Eastern Lunatic Asylum of Virginia.

In 1871 he helped reorganize a volunteer militia for the city of Williamsburg and James City County, Virginia, which he commanded. Known as the Wise Light Infantry, the unit continued at least through 1885, when it appeared during the inaugural festivities of President Grover Cleveland in Washington.

Political career
Despite his Confederate background, Richard Wise became a Republican. He was a delegate to every Republican state convention in Virginia from 1879 to 1900. He was  a delegate to the Republican National Conventions of 1892, 1896, and 1900.

He also held many political offices. He was a member of the Virginia House of Delegates in 1885–1887.

He was Clerk of the Circuit and County Courts of the city of Williamsburg and James City County in 1888–1894.

In 1896, Wise ran for U.S. Representative, but lost to Democrat William A. Young. Wise successfully contested the election result, and served in the Fifty-fifth Congress from April 26, 1898, to March 3, 1899.

This result was repeated in 1898; Wise served in the Fifty-sixth Congress from March 12, 1900, until his death in Williamsburg on December 21, 1900. He was interred in Hollywood Cemetery, Richmond, Virginia.

Electoral history
1896 Wise was defeated in his bid for election to the U.S. House of Representatives by Democrat William Albin Young. However, Wise contested the election result. The House upheld his appeal and Wise was seated. He won a special election unopposed.
1898: Wise was defeated for re-election by Democrat Young. He again contested the election result, was again seated by the House, and again won a special election unopposed.

See also
List of United States Congress members who died in office (1900–49)

Sources

http://babel.hathitrust.org/cgi/pt?id=uva.x004788346;view=1up;seq=11 Memorial addresses on the life and character of Richard Alsop Wise, late a representative from Virginia delivered in the House of Representatives and Senate frontispiece 1901

1843 births
1900 deaths
Northern-born Confederates
Burials at Hollywood Cemetery (Richmond, Virginia)
Confederate States Army officers
County clerks in Virginia
Republican Party members of the United States House of Representatives from Virginia
Politicians from Philadelphia
People of Virginia in the American Civil War
Republican Party members of the Virginia House of Delegates
Politicians from Williamsburg, Virginia
19th-century American politicians
Wise family of Virginia